Janthecla is a Neotropical genus of butterflies in the family Lycaenidae.

Species
Janthecla rocena (Hewitson, 1867)
Janthecla malvina (Hewitson, 1867)
Janthecla janthodonia (Dyar, 1918)
Janthecla cydonia (Druce, 1890)
Janthecla leea Venables & Robbins, 1991
Janthecla armilla (Druce, 1907)
Janthecla janthina (Hewitson, 1867)
Janthecla sista (Hewitson, 1867)
Janthecla aurora (Druce, 1907)
Janthecla flosculus (Druce, 1907)

References

Eumaeini
Lycaenidae of South America
Lycaenidae genera